Hiiu-Rahu Cemetery is a cemetery in Tallinn, Estonia. The area of the cemetery is 2.2 ha, being one of the smallest cemetery in Tallinn.

The cemetery is established in 1919, but inaugurated as late as 1923. The cemetery was designed by Karl Burman.

Notable interments
 Ernst Blumbach (1863–1929), hydrographer
 Peeter Grünfeldt (1865–1937), writer
 Juhan Kukk (1885–1945), statesman
 Rudolf Reimann (1884–1946), military personnel
 Julius Trubock, military personnel

References

External links

 

Cemeteries in Tallinn